The Springville Community School District is a rural public school district headquartered in Springville, Iowa. The district is completely within Linn County, and serves the city of Springville and the surrounding rural areas.

The district is planning to renovate the elementary building by the summer of 2023 and secondary building by the summer of 2025.

Schools
The district operates two schools in one facility in Springville:
 Springville Elementary School
 Springville Secondary School

Springville High School

Athletics
The Orioles participate in the Tri-Rivers Conference in the following sports:
Football
Cross Country
Volleyball
Basketball
 Girls 3-time Class 1A State Champions (2008, 2016, 2017) 
Wrestling
Golf
Track and Field
Baseball
Softball

See also
List of school districts in Iowa
List of high schools in Iowa

References

External links
 Springville Community School District

School districts in Iowa
Education in Linn County, Iowa